Spencer Haywood (born April 22, 1949) is an American former professional basketball player and Olympic gold medalist. Haywood is a member of the Naismith Memorial Basketball Hall of Fame, being inducted in 2015.

Early life
Spencer Haywood was born on April 22, 1949, in Silver City, Mississippi, USA. He grew up in poverty and his family worked as sharecroppers, which meant that they lived on someone else's land and worked the land for a share of the crops.

High school career
In 1964, Haywood moved to Detroit, Michigan residing in the Krainz Woods neighborhood. In 1967, while attending Pershing High School, Haywood led the school's basketball team to the state championship.

College career and Olympics

Haywood attended Trinidad State Junior College in Trinidad, Colorado, during the 1967–68 college season, where he averaged 28.2 points and 22.1 rebounds per game. Due to his exceptional performance and talent, Haywood made the 1968 U.S. Olympic team at age 19, becoming the youngest American basketball player in Olympic history. Haywood was the leading scorer on the gold medal winning team at 16.1 points per game, and he set a Team USA field goal percentage record of .719. Haywood transferred to the University of Detroit in the fall of that year, and led the NCAA in rebounding with a 21.5 average per game while scoring 32.1 points per game during the 1968–69 season.

Haywood decided to turn pro after his sophomore year, but National Basketball Association (NBA) rules, which then required a player to wait until four years after his high school class graduated, prohibited him from entering the league. The American Basketball Association (ABA) had a similar rule, but league executive Mike Storen came up with the idea for a hardship exemption. With his mother raising 10 children while picking cotton at $2 per day in Mississippi, Haywood met the criteria. He joined the Denver Rockets after they selected him in the ABA draft.

Professional career

ABA rookie season
In his 1969–70 rookie season, Haywood led the ABA in both scoring at 30.0 points per game and rebounding at 19.5 rebounds per game, while leading the Rockets to the ABA's Western Division Title. In the playoffs, Denver defeated the Washington Caps in 7 games in the Western Division Semifinals before falling to the Los Angeles Stars in the division finals, 4 games to 1. He was named both the ABA Rookie of the Year and ABA MVP during the season, and became the youngest ever recipient of the MVP at the age of 21. His 986 field goals made, 1,637 rebounds, and 19.5 rebound per game average are the all-time ABA records for a season. Haywood also won the ABA's 1970 All-Star Game MVP that year after recording 23 points, 19 rebounds, and 7 blocked shots for the West team.

NBA career and Italy
In 1970, despite the NBA's eligibility rules, Haywood joined the Seattle SuperSonics, and with SuperSonics owner Sam Schulman launched an antitrust suit against the league (Haywood v. National Basketball Association). The case went all the way to the U.S. Supreme Court before the NBA agreed to a settlement. The suit and its impact on college basketball and the NBA was the focus of a 2020 book The Spencer Haywood Rule: Battles, Basketball, and the Making of an American Iconoclast by Marc J. Spears and Gary Washburn.

Haywood was named to the All-NBA First Team in 1972 and 1973 and the All-NBA Second Team in 1974 and 1975. Haywood's 29.2 points per game in the 1972–73 season and 13.4 rebounds per game in 1973–74 are the single-season record averages for the SuperSonics for these categories. Haywood played in four NBA All-Star Games while with Seattle, including a strong 23-point, 11-rebound performance in 1974. In the 1974–75 season, he helped lead the SuperSonics to their first playoff berth. Overall, during his five seasons with Seattle, Haywood averaged 24.9 points per game and 12.1 rebounds per game.

In 1975, the SuperSonics traded him to the New York Knicks where he later teamed with Bob McAdoo. Haywood later played for the New Orleans Jazz, Los Angeles Lakers, and Washington Bullets.

During the late 1970s, Haywood became addicted to cocaine. He was dismissed from the Lakers by then-coach Paul Westhead during the 1980 NBA Finals for falling asleep during practice due to his addiction.

The next season Haywood played in Italy for Reyer Venezia Mestre (then under the sponsor name "Carrera Reyer Venezia") along with Dražen Dalipagić before returning to the NBA to play two seasons with the Washington Bullets.

Haywood's no. 24 jersey was retired by the SuperSonics during a halftime ceremony on February 26, 2007.

Personal life
Haywood currently resides in Las Vegas. He was married to fashion model Iman from 1977 until 1987, and they had a daughter, Zulekha Haywood (born 1978). He remarried in 1990, and he and his wife, Linda, have three daughters.

He was inducted into the Naismith Memorial Basketball Hall of Fame in September 2015.

Haywood is a huge fan of jazz and has hosted weekly two-hour weekend jazz shows in Seattle (1971–1975, KYAC) and New York (1976–1978, WRVR).

See also
 List of NCAA Division I men's basketball season rebounding leaders

References

External links

 Spoken Word: Spencer Haywood Interview with Michael Tillery of Blacksportsnetwork.com
 “In Black America; Spencer Haywood: Drugs Destroyed My Career,” 1989-10-01, KUT Radio, American Archive of Public Broadcasting

1949 births
Living people
African-American basketball players
All-American college men's basketball players
American expatriate basketball people in Italy
American men's basketball players
Basketball players at the 1968 Summer Olympics
Basketball players from Detroit
Basketball players from Mississippi
Buffalo Braves draft picks
Denver Rockets players
Detroit Mercy Titans men's basketball players
Junior college men's basketball players in the United States
Los Angeles Lakers players
Medalists at the 1968 Summer Olympics
Naismith Memorial Basketball Hall of Fame inductees
National Basketball Association All-Stars
National Basketball Association players with retired numbers
New Orleans Jazz players
New York Knicks players
Olympic gold medalists for the United States in basketball
Parade High School All-Americans (boys' basketball)
People from Humphreys County, Mississippi
Pershing High School alumni
Power forwards (basketball)
Reyer Venezia players
Seattle SuperSonics players
United States men's national basketball team players
Washington Bullets players
21st-century African-American people
20th-century African-American sportspeople